Barron is a Scottish surname. Notable people with the surname include:

Alex Barron (disambiguation)
Andrew Barron (disambiguation)
Baynes Barron (1917–1982), American film and television actor
Blue Barron (1913–2005), American orchestra leader
Brian Barron (1940–2009), British BBC foreign and war correspondent
Carl Barron (born 1964), Australian business magnate of Carl's Ultimate Streaming Service
Charles Barron, American politician
Christopher R. Barron,  member of the board of directors and co-founder of GOProud
Clarence W. Barron (1855–1928), owner and president of Dow Jones & Company
Clarke Charles Netterville Barron, Chief Reporter of Parliamentary Debates (Hansard) for the New Zealand Parliament for 29 years from 1867
Colin Fraser Barron (1893–1958), Canadian recipient of the Victoria Cross
Connor Barron (born 2002), Scottish footballer (Aberdeen FC)
Dana Barron (born 1968), American actor
Diane Barron, former British ballroom dancer
Doug Barron, Scottish footballer
Earl Barron (born 1981), American professional basketball player
Edward Hugh Barron, Australian soldier and pioneer
Elizabeth Cervantes Barron, American politician
Eric J. Barron, president of Florida State University; director of the National Center for Atmospheric Research
Fraser Barron, (1921–1944) RNZAF bomber pilot during World War II
Fred Barron (fl. 1898–1911), English footballer
George Charleton Barron, (c. 1846–1891), British actor and general entertainer
George Ward Barron, (1883–1961) English professional footballer
Gladys Barron (1884–1967), British artist
Harry Barron (1847–1921), Governor of Tasmania (1909–13)
Herman Barron (1909–1978), American professional golfer
Jackie Barron, New Zealand sports administrator and school principal
James Barron (disambiguation)
Jeff Barron (1908–1966), New Zealand lawn bowler
Jerome A. Barron, American professor of law
Jim Barron (born 1943), former English footballer
John Barron (disambiguation)
John Shepherd-Barron (1925–2010), Scottish inventor
Julia Tarrant Barron (1805–1890), founder of Judson College and Howard College
Justin Barron (born 2001), Canadian ice hockey player
Keith Barron (1936–2017), English actor and television presenter
Kenny Barron (born 1943), American jazz pianist
Kevin Barron (born 1946), British Labour Party politician
Laird Barron (born 1970), American author
Louis and Bebe Barron, American pioneers in electronic music
Mark Barron, American football player
Michael Barron (born 1974), English footballer
Nicholas Shepherd-Barron, British mathematician
Nola Barron (born 1931), New Zealand potter
Norman Barron (1899–1987), Australian rules footballer
Paul Barron (born 1953), English football goalkeeper
Richard Barron, Canadian translator
Robert Barron (minister) (1596-1639) prominent Scottish clergyman
Robert Barron (born 1959), Roman Catholic priest, Auxiliary Bishop of Los Angeles, seminary rector, author, scholar, and Catholic evangelist
Samuel Barron (disambiguation)
Scott Barron (born 1985), English professional footballer
Sid Barron (1917–2006), Canadian editorial cartoonist
Stephanie Barron, American novelist
Sylura Barron (1900–1997), African-American political activist
T. A. Barron (born 1952), American author of children's fantasy literature
Tony Barron (born 1956), American Major League baseball player
Valentina Barron (born 1993), Australian film actress
William N. Barron (1859–1???), American lawyer
William Wallace Barron (1911–2002), American politician

See also 
Andy Murray
Baron (name)

Surnames from status names